The Xinlitun railway station is a railway station of Dazheng railway, Xinyi railway and Gaoxin railway located in People's Republic of China.

Railway stations in Liaoning
Stations on the Xinlitun–Yixian Railway